The badminton men's singles tournament at the 2015 European Games took place from 22 to 28 June.

Competition format
The singles tournaments will be played with 32 participants, initially playing in eight groups of four, before the top two from each group qualify for a 16-player knock-out stage.

Schedule
All times are in AZST (UTC+05).

Seeds

Seeds for all badminton events at the inaugural European Games were announced on 29 May.

Results
The group stage draws were held on 2 June.

Group stage

Group A

Group B

Group C

Group D

Group E

Group F

Group G

Group H

Knock-out stage

References

External links

Badminton at the 2015 European Games